This list exhibits the National Basketball Association's top single-season rebounding averages based on at least 70 games played or 800 rebounds. The NBA did not record rebounds until the 1950-51 season.

See also
List of National Basketball Association top rookie rebounding averages
National Basketball Association

External links
Basketball-Reference.com

National Basketball Association top individual rebounding season averages
National Basketball Association statistical leaders